General elections were held in Malta between 17 and 19 February 1962. The Nationalist Party emerged as the largest party, winning 25 of the 50 seats.

Electoral system
The elections were held using the single transferable vote system, whilst the number of seats was increased from 40 to 50.

Results

References

General elections in Malta
Malta
1962 in Malta
February 1962 events in Europe
1962 elections in the British Empire